This is a list of monasteries in Bucharest.

Extant monasteries

Historical monasteries

 
Bucharest
Monasteries
Monasteries in Bucharest